Era Television is a nationwide cable TV network in Taiwan that is operated by ERA Communications Inc., established in October 1996.

Era TV Channels
Era TV currently operates three commercial cable television channels: 
Era News
Much TV
Azio TV

See also
 List of Taiwanese television series

External links

 Era TV official website

Television stations in Taiwan
Chinese-language television stations
Television channels and stations established in 1996